Trentepohliaceae are a family of green algae in the order Trentepohliales.

References

 
Ulvophyceae families